The 1973 NCAA Division I tournament championship game was played at Franklin Field in Philadelphia in front of 5,965 fans. The undefeated Maryland Terrapins, led by coach Bud Beardmore and Hall of Fame midfielder Frank Urso defeated Johns Hopkins 10 to 9 in two overtimes, with Urso scoring the winning goal 1:18 into the second overtime.

Tournament overview
The top eight teams in the season-ending lacrosse coaches poll were selected to play in the 1973 tournament.

Johns Hopkins defeated Virginia 12-9 and Maryland beat Washington and Lee 18–5 to reach the national championship game. The win represented Maryland's eighth overall men's lacrosse National Title, but first under the newly instituted NCAA lacrosse tournament format. Bud Beardmore was named USILA Coach of the Year.

Prior to the Hopkins overtime win, the Terrapins closest game was a five-goal victory against UMBC. Maryland had beaten Hopkins 17 to 4 in the regular season about a month prior to the finals. In the Terps' ten games, they averaged 17 goals per game and held opponents to 6 goals per game.

Johns Hopkins used a possession game to counter the Terrapins' top rated offense, which resulted in over fifteen minutes of limited-shooting possessions by the Blue Jays in the first half. Maryland countered with patient and mistake-free defensive play to offset the stall tactic though Frank Urso was able to get free to score three goals. Hopkins held the ball for the first 10:45 of the game, with the first shot of the game not being taken until over eight minutes had passed. Hopkins' tactics worked initially as the Blue Jays took a 5–2 lead at halftime.

Maryland overcame Johns Hopkins' possession game in the second half, outscoring the Jays 8–4 in the second half, with the winning goal coming in the second overtime for the 10–9 victory. Urso scored the game-winner taking a solo run at goal and converting a 15-yard bounce shot. Since this was not a sudden-death overtime period, Maryland held for the final three minutes to win the contest.

The Terps had encountered little resistance on their way to the title as they downed Brown 16-4 and Washington and Lee 18–7 in the first two rounds. Johns Hopkins had disposed of Army 11-5 and the defending national champion Virginia 12–9.

Washington and Lee goalie Skeet Chadwick had 52 saves in two tournament games. Washington and Lee, a recent addition to the top tier of teams, beat Navy in a three overtime marathon 13–12 in the first round.

Jack Thomas of Johns Hopkins had 11 tournament assists.

Tournament results

(ii) two overtimes
(iii) three overtimes

Tournament boxscores
Tournament Finals

Tournament Semi-Finals

Tournament Quarterfinals

Tournament outstanding players

Jack Thomas, Johns Hopkins, 14 pts (3g, 11a), leading tournament scorer

 The NCAA did not designate a Most Outstanding Player until the 1977 national tournament. The Tournament outstanding player is listed here as the tournament leading scorer.

References

External links
Sports Illustrated: Not Quite A Terrapin Stew, SI write-up on National Title game

NCAA Division I Men's Lacrosse Championship
NCAA Division I Men's Lacrosse Championship
NCAA Division I Men's Lacrosse Championship
NCAA Division I Men's Lacrosse Championship
NCAA Division I Men's Lacrosse Championship
NCAA Division I Men's Lacrosse Championship